Naval trawlers were purpose-built or requisitioned and operated by the Royal Navy (RN), mainly during World Wars I and II. Vessels built to Admiralty specifications for RN use were known as Admiralty trawlers. All trawlers operated by the RN, regardless of origin, were typically given the prefix HMT, for "His Majesty's Trawler".

Summary

First World War

The trawler Viola, built in 1906 at Hull and requisitioned September 1914 is the oldest surviving steam trawler in the world. She is currently beached at Grytviken in South Georgia, though there are currently plans to return her to Hull.

Second World War

Requisitioned trawlers

There were also 215 trawlers of no specific class These were commercial trawlers that the Admiralty requisitioned. The Royal Navy classified requisitioned trawlers by manufacturer, although such classes were more diverse than traditional naval classifications. Seventy-two requisitioned trawlers were lost.

See also
 Anti-submarine warfare
 Auxiliary Patrol
 List of mine countermeasure vessels of the Royal Navy 
 Minesweepers of the Royal New Zealand Navy
 Royal Naval Patrol Service
 Vorpostenboot, the German equivalent to the trawlers of the Royal Navy

Footnotes

References

 Cocker, M P (1993) Mine Warfare Vessels of the Royal Navy - 1908 to date. Airlife Publishing. 

 
 Lund, Paul and Ludlam, Harry (1971) The Trawlers go to War 
 Lund, Paul and Ludlam, Harry (1978) Out Sweeps! - The Story of the Minesweepers in World War II. New English Library Ltd 
 McKee, Alexander (1973) The Coal-Scuttle Brigade : The splendid, dramatic story of the Channel convoys. New English Library ASIN B000RTAX2Y
 RNPS Book list
 Royal Naval Patrol Service Booklist
 Books about the RNPS

External links
 A/S Trawlers (uboat.net)>
 The Trawlers go to War
 The Battle of Mesco Point
 The Dover Convoys
 The 'Art' of Minesweeping
 Naval Trawlers
 Trawlers lost in the Namsen Fjord
 The Loss of HMT Cap d'Antifer
 The Loss of the Rutlandshire
 HM Trawler Orfasy
 List of all trawlers lost during WW2
 Memorial site to a trawler skipper
 HMS Almond Memorial Site
History of the Royal Navy